Ghoria albocinerea is a moth of the family Erebidae. It was described by Frederic Moore in 1878. It is found in Sikkim, India.

References

Lithosiina
Moths described in 1878
Moths of Asia